Värati is a village in Tõstamaa Parish, Pärnu County, in southwestern Estonia. It is located just south of Tõstamaa, the administrative centre of the municipality. Värati has a population of 41 (as of 1 January 2011).

References

Villages in Pärnu County